Daniel Fuchs (June 25, 1909 – July 26, 1993) was an American screenwriter, fiction writer, and essayist.

Biography
Daniel Fuchs was born to a Jewish family on the Lower East Side, Manhattan, but his family moved to Williamsburg, Brooklyn while Fuchs was an infant. He wrote three early novels, published by the Vanguard Press — Summer in Williamsburg (1934), Homage to Blenholt (1936), and Low Company (1937). The earlier two of these depicted Jewish life in Williamsburg; the last focused on various ethnic types in Brighton Beach. A single-volume edition of these was published by Basic Books in 1965 under the title "Three Novels."  Subsequent one-volume editions include The Brooklyn Novels, with an introduction by the novelist Jonathan Lethem, published in 2006 by Black Sparrow Books, an imprint of David R. Godine, Publisher.

Homage to Blenholt concerns a well-meaning tenement schlemiel who hopes to escape poverty via various inventions and get-rich quick schemes. Fuchs also wrote short stories and personal essays, mainly for The New Yorker. When he was 26, he moved to Los Angeles, California to work on films.

Fuchs wrote the screenplay for the crime noir Criss Cross (1949). He also penned the psychodrama Panic in the Streets (1950), which was directed by Elia Kazan. In 1995, Criss Cross was remade as The Underneath by director Steven Soderbergh, with credit given to Fuchs. Love Me or Leave Me, a biopic about the torch singer Ruth Etting, which won Fuchs an Oscar for Best Story in 1955, featured a performance by James Cagney in the role of a Chicago hoodlum and Doris Day as the beleaguered songstress.

Fuchs' Hollywood novel, West of the Rockies, was published in 1971, and in 1979 appeared a collection of mostly earlier-written short stories, "The Apathetic Bookie Joint." The Golden West: Hollywood Stories, a collection of Fuchs's fiction and essays about Hollywood, was published in 2005 by Black Sparrow Books.

Fuchs died in Los Angeles.

Critique
Irving Howe wrote of Fuchs for Commentary Magazine in 1948 that "he showed such a rich gift for fictional portraiture of Jewish life in the American city that, given sustained work and growth of mind, he might have written its still-uncreated comedie humaine. After reading Fuchs' work one wonders: What was the source of his talent and the cause of his silence, and, perhaps more important, what was the relationship between his talent and his silence?"

John Updike said, "Nobody else writes like Daniel Fuchs. I think of him as a natural—a poet who never had to strain after a poetic effect, a magician who made magic look almost too easy."

Works

Books
Fuchs published with the Viking Press via the Maxim Lieber Literary Agency; Elizabeth Nowell (who later became Thomas Wolfe's exclusive agent) handled him.  
 Summer in Williamsburg (1934)
 Homage to Blenholt (1936)
 Low Company (1937)
 Three Novels (1965):  omnibus of earlier novels

Scripts 
 The Hard Way (1943)
 Between Two Worlds (1944)
 The Gangster (1947), based on his own novel Low Company
Hollow Triumph (1948)
 Criss Cross (1949)
 Panic in the Streets (1950)
 Storm Warning (1951)
 The Human Jungle (1954)
 Love Me Or Leave Me (1955)
 Jeanne Eagels (1957)
 Interlude (1957)

Awards 

 1980: National Jewish Book Award for The Apathetic Bookie Joint

References

External links 
Homage to Blenholt: The Daniel Fuchs Papers The Ohio State University Libraries Rare Books and Manuscripts Collection

1909 births
1993 deaths
20th-century American novelists
American male novelists
American male screenwriters
Best Story Academy Award winners
Jewish American novelists
Writers from Brooklyn
Writers from Los Angeles
American male short story writers
American male essayists
20th-century American short story writers
20th-century American essayists
20th-century American male writers
Novelists from New York (state)
Screenwriters from New York (state)
Screenwriters from California
People from Williamsburg, Brooklyn
People from the Lower East Side
20th-century American screenwriters
20th-century American Jews